Fryshuset Basket is a basketball club founded in 1984 in Stockholm, Sweden. The clubs plays in the Basketligan Swedish top basketball league. Home games are played in the Fryshuset Sporthall.

References

External links
Official website

Basketball teams established in 1984
Basketball teams in Sweden
Sport in Stockholm
1984 establishments in Sweden